The 1944 Invercargill mayoral election was part of the New Zealand local elections held that same year. The polling was conducted using the standard first-past-the-post electoral method.

Incumbent mayor Abraham Wachner was re-elected with an increased majority.

Results
The following table gives the election results:

References

1944 elections in New Zealand
Mayoral elections in Invercargill